Josefa is a village in Limpopo province; it falls under Mhinga Tribal Authority.

References

Populated places in the Thulamela Local Municipality